Whiteface may refer to:

Makeup 
The whiteface clown, a form of clown makeup
Whiteface (performance)

Places in the United States 
Whiteface, Texas, a town
Whiteface Consolidated Independent School District, a public school district based in Whiteface, Texas
Whiteface, Minnesota
Whiteface Mountain, the fifth-highest mountain in New York state
Whiteface Mountain, the highest mountain in Simi Valley, California
Mount Whiteface, in the White Mountains of New Hampshire
Whiteface Reservoir, Minnesota, an unorganized territory
Whiteface River (Minnesota)
Whiteface River (New Hampshire)

Other 
Whiteface (band), a band from Atlanta in the 1970s
Whiteface Dartmoor, a breed of sheep
Whiteface cattle, vernacular name, especially in the United States, for Hereford cattle
Three species of birds in the genus Aphelocephala
Dragonflies in the genus Leucorrhinia

See also 
Blackface (disambiguation)